Densham is a surmame. Notable people with the surname include:

 Erin Densham (born 1985), Australian triathlete
 John Densham (1880–1975), British hurdler
 Pen Densham (born 1947), British/Canadian film and TV producer
 Philip Densham (born 1957), English cricketer
 Tim Densham (born 1955), British Formula One engineer